The 1967–68 Iowa State Cyclones men's basketball team represented Iowa State University during the 1967–68 NCAA Division I men's basketball season. The Cyclones were coached by Glen Anderson, who was in his ninth season with the Cyclones. They played their home games at the Iowa State Armory in Ames, Iowa.

Don Smith (later known as Zaid Abdul-Aziz) won Big Eight Conference Player of the Year.

They finished the season 12–13, 8–6 in Big Eight play to finish tied for third place.

Roster

Schedule and results 

|-
!colspan=6 style=""|Regular Season

|-

References 

Iowa State Cyclones men's basketball seasons
Iowa State
Iowa State Cyc
Iowa State Cyc